The Superior Court of Washington for King County (more commonly, the King County Superior Court) is the largest trial court in Washington state. It is based at the King County Courthouse, 516 Third Avenue, in downtown Seattle, Washington. It also operates a juvenile facility and a Regional Justice Center in Kent, southeast of Seattle.

The court has (as of November 2018) 53 judges who have general jurisdiction to hear major civil and criminal cases. The court also has appellate jurisdiction over certain decisions of the district courts, municipal courts, and administrative tribunals.

Current judges

Notable judges
Walter B. Beals
Adam Beeler
William L. Downing
Barbara Durham
Matthew W. Hill
Faith Ireland
Richard A. Jones
Robert S. Lasnik
Ricardo S. Martinez
Marsha Pechman
John S. Robinson
Stanley C. Soderland
Gary Little
Mary Yu

References

External links
http://www.kingcounty.gov/courts/superiorcourt.aspx

Superior Court
Government of Seattle
Washington, King County
Washington (state) state courts
Courts and tribunals with year of establishment missing